Roger Chauviré (1880, Constantine – 14 March 1957, Paris) was a French writer, winner of the 1933 edition of the Grand Prix du roman de l'Académie française.

Biography 
Roger Chauviré long taught at the National University of Ireland. A novelist, poet and historian, he wrote numerous articles and books on the mythological history and traditions of the Gaelic countries. He was also a specialist in the work of Jean Bodin and wrote a thesis published in 1914.

Chauviré won several prizes awarded by the Académie française including the Grand prix Gobert (1917) for Jean Bodin, auteur de la République, the Prix Archon-Despérouses (1922) for Le tombeau d’Hector, twice the Prix Montyon (1927) for La geste de la branche rouge ou l’Iliade irlandaise and (1930) for L’incantation and the Grand Prix du Roman (1930) for Mademoiselle de Boisdauphin.

The Irish war of independence took place during his first years in Ireland and he wrote a book on the subject " L'Irlande insurgée", later translated as "Ireland in rebellion". This was written under the pseudonym Sylvain Briollay. He took the name from the town of Briollay, in the Loire valley
, where he spent his summers. A street in the town is named after him.

Works 
 1914: Jean Bodin, auteur de "La République", Champion.
 1926: La Geste de la Branche rouge, Librairie de France
 1929: L'Incantation, Firmin-Didot
 1933: Mademoiselle de Bois-Dauphin, Grand prix du roman de l'Académie française
 1937: Le Secret de Marie Stuart, Armand Colin
 1938: Cécile Vardoux, Flammarion
 1947: preface of L'épopée irlandaise T2
 1949: Contes ossianiques, Presses universitaires de France
 1949: Greg le Libérateur, Flammarion
 1951: La Guerre et l'amour, chronique du règne de Henri III, André Bonne
 1953: Au fil des jours : poèmes, Éditions de l'Ouest
 1954: Madame Marin ou la Vertu récompensée, André Bonne

References

External links 
 Roger Chauviré. Jean Bodin, auteur de la «République». (compte rendu) on Persée
 Introduction to Bernard Shaw by R. Chauviré on Revue des deux Mondes
 Roger Chauviré on the site of the Académie française

20th-century French non-fiction writers
20th-century French male writers
Grand Prix du roman de l'Académie française winners
People from Constantine, Algeria
1880 births
1957 deaths